Adani may refer to:

 Adani (surname)
 Adani Group, an Indian multinational conglomerate
 Adani Foundation, a charitable foundation
 Gujarat Adani Institute of Medical Sciences, a medical college and hospital in Gujarat, India
 Adani Ports & SEZ Limited, an Indian port operator
 Adani Power, an Indian power company

See also

 
 Adan (disambiguation)